Kirilapone North is a suburb of Colombo, Sri Lanka.

References

Populated places in Colombo District